David Edward Martin (born 22 January 1986) is an English professional footballer who is a goalkeeper player-coach for Milton Keynes Dons. He has played for the England under-17, England under-19 and England under-20 teams.

Club career

Youth career
Born in Romford in the London Borough of Havering, Martin started his career as a youth-team player with Tottenham Hotspur where he originally played as defender.

Wimbledon /  Milton Keynes Dons
He moved to Wimbledon in 2003, shortly before the club relocated to Milton Keynes in September of that year. After the club was reformed as Milton Keynes Dons in June 2004, Martin made his debut in 2004 and went on to make 25 appearances for the club, including 15 league appearances to January 2006.

Liverpool
After a successful trial period, he signed for Liverpool on 12 January 2006. He was an unused substitute in Liverpool's League Cup game against Reading on 25 October 2006. In his first season playing for Liverpool Reserves he kept eight clean sheets out of 13 starts, and became a regular starter in the reserve team. And when Charles Itandje was injured he was an unused substitute in a number of first team matches.

Accrington Stanley loan
On 23 February 2007 he was signed by Football League Two club, Accrington Stanley on loan for a month. However, he was injured within five minutes of his debut, without even touching the ball, against Lincoln City, damaging his ankle which ruled him out for the rest of his loan spell and he returned to Liverpool. After regaining his fitness he returned to Accrington on loan for the rest of the season, making his comeback in a 1–0 win over Torquay United, and helping the club avoid relegation to the Conference National.

Return to Liverpool
On 6 November 2007 Martin was on the bench when Liverpool beat Turkish club, Beşiktaş 8–0 at Anfield in their UEFA Champions League group match. He was a member of the Liverpool reserve team which was Premier Reserve League Northern champions and Premier League National champions in the 2007–08 season. In May 2008 he signed a new contract with Liverpool until June 2010.

Leicester City loan

On 4 August 2008, Martin joined League One team Leicester City on a six-month loan, making his debut in a 1–0 home win over Stockport on 12 August. In December, Martin's loan deal at Leicester was extended until the end of the season. He revealed on 30 January 2009 that he wanted a permanent move to Leicester, having made 13 clean sheets in 26 appearances for the club. Martin made a total of 25 league appearances as Leicester secured their promotion as league champions, but was unable to secure a permanent deal with the club.

Return to Liverpool again
Rafael Benitez named Martin in Liverpool's 28-man squad for the 2009–10 Champions League group stage.

Tranmere Rovers loan
On 16 October 2009 he joined Tranmere Rovers on loan for a month. Martin competed for the number one jersey with Luke Daniels and played three league games for Tranmere before returning to Liverpool. Martin was an unused substitute against Southampton.

Leeds United loan
On 26 November, Martin joined Leeds United on loan until 28 December to provide cover for the injured Shane Higgs and provide competition with Casper Ankergren and Alan Martin. Liverpool decided to not allow him to be available for Leeds' FA Cup games. Martin was named on the bench against Oldham Athletic, meaning he replaced Alan Martin as Leeds' sub goalkeeper whilst Higgs was injured.

He made his debut for Leeds in the Football League Trophy Northern Section semi-final at Elland Road against Accrington Stanley. On 24 December he extended his loan by a further month, until 30 January, and Liverpool also gave him permission to play for Leeds against Manchester United F.C. in the FA Cup. The loan extension was largely to do with Higgs suffering a further setback in his recovery from injury. Martin's loan deal was extended again on Transfer on deadline day (1 February) until 10 February 2010 after which he returned to Liverpool.

Derby County loan
On 12 March 2010, Martin joined Derby County on a month's loan as cover for the injured Stephen Bywater and to play in the match against Doncaster Rovers on 13 March after reserve goalkeeper, Saul Deeney, received a red card during the same match against Reading on 10 March. He kept his place for a 2–2 draw with Middlesbrough but the return of Bywater, combined with the allowance of only five loan players in the match day squad when Derby had six, saw Martin uninvolved with the first team for the remainder of his month at the club. He returned to Liverpool on 12 April 2010.

Milton Keynes Dons (second spell)

Martin signed for former club Milton Keynes Dons on 12 May 2010 and was new manager Karl Robinson's first signing at the club. He joined on 1 July 2010. On 3 May 2016, Martin was named the club's Player of the Year for the 2015–16 season.

On 20 April 2017, after nine seasons and 339 appearances for the club, Martin announced that he would be leaving MK Dons at the end of the 2016–17 season.

Millwall
He signed for newly promoted Championship side Millwall on 1 September 2017. At the end of the 2017–18 season, his contract was automatically extended by Millwall. On 17 March 2019, Martin apologised on Twitter following making a 95th minute error in Millwall's FA Cup quarter-final tie against Brighton & Hove Albion to allow Solly March to equalise for Brighton and take the game into extra time. Millwall eventually lost on penalties.

West Ham United
On 3 June 2019, Martin signed a two-year contract with Premier League side West Ham United, to provide cover for first choice keepers Łukasz Fabiański and Roberto. Martin made his West Ham and Premier League debut on 30 November 2019 after Fabiański picked up an injury and Roberto was dropped due to poor form, keeping a clean sheet in a 1–0 away win against Chelsea; a performance which Martin later described as the best day of his life. At the end of the 2020–21 season, Martin signed a one-year contract extension, seeing him undertake a player-coach role for the 2021–22 season. In May 2022, West Ham announced that Martin would be leaving the club at the end of his contract in June 2022.

Milton Keynes Dons (third spell)

Martin signed again for former club Milton Keynes Dons on 23 September 2022, agreeing to a player-coach contract. He reunited with Dean Lewington, whom he played alongside for both Wimbledon and Milton Keynes Dons in 2004, and subsequential years for the latter club.

International career
Martin played for the England under-17 at the UEFA European Under-17 Football Championship in 2003. He played for the England under-19 team at the UEFA European Under-19 Football Championship in 2005, when England were runners-up to France Under 20s in the final held at Windsor Park, Belfast Northern Ireland. He has also been capped once by the England under-20 team.

Personal life

Martin is the son of former West Ham United player Alvin Martin. His brother Joe is also a footballer.

Career statistics

Honours
Liverpool Reserves
Premier Reserve League: 2007–08
Premier Reserve League North Division: 2007–08

Leicester City
Football League One: 2008–09

Milton Keynes Dons
Football League One runner-up: 2014–15

Individual
Milton Keynes Dons Player of the Year: 2015–16

References

External links
Liverpool FC profile

1986 births
Living people
Footballers from Romford
English footballers
England youth international footballers
Association football goalkeepers
Wimbledon F.C. players
Milton Keynes Dons F.C. players
Liverpool F.C. players
Accrington Stanley F.C. players
Leicester City F.C. players
Tranmere Rovers F.C. players
Leeds United F.C. players
Derby County F.C. players
Millwall F.C. players
West Ham United F.C. players
English Football League players
Premier League players
Association football coaches